Six judges of the International Criminal Court were elected during the 13th session of the Assembly of States Parties to the Rome Statute of the International Criminal Court scheduled for 8 to 17 December 2014 in New York. The judges were elected for terms of nine years and took office on 11 March 2015.

Background 

The judges elected at this session replaced those six judges which were elected at the second election of ICC judges in 2006 for a full term of nine years; they will also serve for nine years until 2024.

The election was governed by the Rome Statute of the International Criminal Court. Its article 36(8)(a) states that "[t]he States Parties shall, in the selection of judges, take into account the need, within the membership of the Court, for:
 (i) The representation of the principal legal systems of the world;
 (ii) Equitable geographical representation; and
 (iii) A fair representation of female and male judges."

Furthermore, article 36(3)(b) and 36(5) provide for two lists:
 List A contains those judges that "[h]ave established competence in criminal law and procedure, and the necessary relevant experience, whether as judge, prosecutor, advocate or in other similar capacity, in criminal proceedings";
 List B contains those who "[h]ave established competence in relevant areas of international law such as international humanitarian law and the law of human rights, and extensive experience in a professional legal capacity which is of relevance to the judicial work of the Court".

Each candidate has to belong to exactly one list.

Further rules of election were adopted by a resolution of the Assembly of States Parties in 2004.

Judges remaining in office 
As of August 2014, the following judges are scheduled to remain in office beyond 2015:

Nomination process 
Following these rules, the nomination period of judges for the 2014 election lasts from 28 April to 20 July 2014. It was extended once due to the lack of candidates from Asia until 3 August 2014. The following persons were nominated as of 4 August 2014:

Minimum voting requirements 
Minimum voting requirements govern part of the election. This is to ensure that article 36(8)(a) cited above was fulfilled. For this election, the following minimum voting requirements will exist; they will be adjusted once the election is underway.

Assuming that there is no change in the bench, the voting requirements will be as follows:

Regarding the List A or B requirement, there are two seats reserved for List B judges. This requirement must be fulfilled under any circumstances.

Regarding the regional criteria, there are three seats reserved for regional groups: two for the Eastern European States and one for the Asian States.

Regarding the gender criteria, there is one seat reserved for male candidates.

The regional and gender criteria can be adjusted even before the election depending on the number of candidates. Paragraph 20(b) of the ASP resolution that governs the elections states that if there are less than double the number of candidates required for each region, the minimum voting requirement would have been a (rounded-up) half of the number of candidates; except when there is only one candidate which would result in no voting requirement.

The regional and gender criteria will be dropped either if they are not (jointly) possible any more, or if after four ballots not all seats are filled.

Ballots
All results are from the ASP homepage if not otherwise noted.

Minimum voting requirements (MVR)

References

 Election,2014
2014 elections
Non-partisan elections